Simão Rodrigues dos Santos (born July 5, 1984, in Rio de Janeiro), or simply Simão, is a Brazilian attacking midfielder. He currently plays for Guarany de Sobral.

Honours
Ceará State League: 2007

External links
 

zerozero.pt 
globoesporte 

1984 births
Living people
Brazilian footballers
Guarani FC players
Club Athletico Paranaense players
Brasiliense Futebol Clube players
ABC Futebol Clube players
Associação Portuguesa de Desportos players
Fortaleza Esporte Clube players
América Futebol Clube (MG) players
Paulínia Futebol Clube players
Association football midfielders
Pan American Games medalists in football
Pan American Games silver medalists for Brazil
Footballers at the 2003 Pan American Games
Medalists at the 2003 Pan American Games
Footballers from Rio de Janeiro (city)